Higher Folds is a settlement about 15 miles from Manchester, in the unparished area of Leigh, in the Wigan district, in the county of Greater Manchester, England. In 2018 it had an estimated population of 2,770. Shaun Keaveny grew up in Higher Folds.

Amenities 
Higher Folds did have a church that belong to the St Gabriels. The St gabriels church was knocked down and Richmond Park was built on the land. Another church located near the new development state called Walmsley Park, it was demolished in 1978 and what remains is a handrail and stones that lead to Walmsley

History 
Higherfolds was a small croft that consisted of farm lands and small industries that were located near Bedford village in the 1800s. This is the only croft under the "folds" naming convention in Bedford that remains.

Higher Folds estate was developed in the 1950s. In 2001 Higher Folds had the highest number of divorced people in England, in 2005 it ranked within the 8% most disadvantaged Super Output Areas in England.

References 

Villages in Greater Manchester
Leigh, Greater Manchester